The Eighth Australian Recording Industry Association Music Awards (generally known as the ARIA Music Awards or simply The ARIAS) was held on 30 March 1994 at the State Theatre in Sydney. Radio and TV personality Richard Stubbs hosted the ceremony and was assisted by presenters to distribute 26 awards.

In addition to previous categories, new categories for Best Alternative Release and Best Pop/Dance Release were presented for the first time. A Special Achievement Award was presented to former Go-Set music journalist and pioneer radio DJ, Stan Rofe. The ARIA Hall of Fame inducted Men at Work.

Ceremony details 

The Cruel Sea won five categories for their album The Honeymoon Is Over (1993) and its title track. According to Australian music journalist, Anthony O'Grady, they displayed "a churning rumble of swamp boogie, surf instrumentals and punk iconoclasm, not immediately radio's hottest wish list." Speculation that they would not turn up proved unfounded. The group's guitarist Dan Rumour finished an acceptance speech with, "The press said we'd clean up at tonight's awards, so you can help us by stacking the chairs and emptying the ashtrays as you leave." Newspapers reported the following day that, at an after-party, the band's lead singer Tex Perkins had been injured during a scuffle with a drunken guest and that, separately, two of the group's trophies had been stolen.

Presenters and performers 

The ARIA Awards ceremony was hosted by TV personality Richard Stubbs. Presenters and performers were:

Awards

Nominees for most awards are shown, in plain, with winners in bold.

ARIA Awards

Album of the Year 
The Cruel Sea – The Honeymoon Is Over
The Badloves – Get On Board
Crowded House – Together Alone
Diesel – The Lobbyist
John Farnham – Then Again...
Single of the Year 
The Cruel Sea – "The Honeymoon Is Over"
The Badloves – "Lost"
Jimmy Barnes – "Stone Cold"
Crowded House – "Distant Sun"
Diesel – "Never Miss Your Water"
Highest Selling Album 
John Farnham – Then Again...
Jimmy Barnes – Flesh and Wood
The Black Sorrows – The Chosen Ones
Wendy Matthews – Lily
The Seekers – The Silver Jubilee Album
Highest Selling Single 
Peter Andre – "Gimme a Little Sign"
Chocolate Starfish – "You're So Vain"
INXS – "The Gift"
Screaming Jets – "Shivers"
Things of Stone and Wood – "Happy Birthday Helen"
Best Group
The Cruel Sea – The Honeymoon Is Over
Baby Animals – Shaved and Dangerous
Crowded House – Together Alone
INXS – Full Moon, Dirty Hearts
Midnight Oil – Earth and Sun and Moon
Best Female Artist 
Wendy Matthews – "Friday's Child"
Kate Ceberano – "You've Got a Friend"
Deborah Conway – Bitch Epic
Anne Kirkpatrick – "Game of Love"
Margaret Urlich – "Burnt Sienna"
Best Male Artist
Diesel – The Lobbyist
Jimmy Barnes – Flesh and Wood
John Farnham – Then Again...
Tim Finn – Before & After
Tex Perkins – Sad But True
Best New Talent 
The Badloves – Get On Board
Robertson Brothers – I Know Why
Margot Smith – "Sleeping with the Lion"
Vincent Stone – Sunshine
Swoop – Thriller
Breakthrough Artist – Album
The Badloves – Get On Board
Peter Andre – Peter Andre
Things of Stone and Wood – The Yearning
Tiddas – Sing About Life
The Sharp – This Is the Sharp
Breakthrough Artist – Single
The Badloves – "Lost"
Chocolate Starfish – "You're So Vain"
Christine Anu – "Last Train"
D.I.G. – "Re-invent Yourself"
Vincent Stone – "Sunshine"
Best Pop Release 
Peter Andre – Peter Andre
Bellydance – One Blood
Girlfriend – It's Up to YouToni Pearen – "I Want You"
Sound Unlimited – "One More from the City"
Best Country Album Lee Kernaghan – Three Chain RoadGraeme Connors – The Return
Slim Dusty – Ringer from the Top End
Anne Kirkpatrick – Game of Love
John Williamson – Love is a Good Woman
Best Independent Release Ed Kuepper – Serene MachineThe Jackson Code – Dragging the River
Juice – Movin' On
Dave Steel – Cross My Palm
Brenda Webb – Little Black Girl
Best Alternative Release You Am I – "Sound As Ever"Clouds – Thunderhead
Crow – My Kind of Pain
The Cruel Sea – The Honeymoon Is Over
Dave Graney & the Coral Snakes – Night of the Wolverine
Best Indigenous Release Tiddas – Sing About LifeKev Carmody – Bloodlines
Not Drowning, Waving – Circus
Archie Roach – Jamu Dreaming
Yothu Yindi – Freedom
Best Adult Contemporary Album Tommy Emmanuel – The JourneyJames Blundell – Touch of Water
Grace Knight – Gracious
Rick Price & Margaret Urlich – "Where Is the Love?"
The Seekers – 25 Year Reunion Celebration
Best Comedy Release Steady Eddy – Ready Steady GoDouble Take – Hercules Returns
Rolf Harris – Rolf Rules OK
Jimeoin – Goin' Off
Doug Mulray – Nice Legs Shame About the Fez

Fine Arts Awards
Best Jazz Album Mike Bukovsky – WanderlustAtmaSphere – Flying
Judy Bailey – Sundial
The Catholics – The Catholics
Mike Nock – Touch
Best Classical Album Dene Olding, Sydney Symphony Orchestra, Challender, Porcelijn – Ross Edwards Orchestral WorksAustralian Chamber Orchestra & Richard Tognetti – Mendelssohn: Octet in E Flat for Strings Op. 20 Sinfonia No. 9 in C. Swiss
Australian Chamber Orchestra & Richard Tognetti – Symphony Serenades and Suites
Nigel Butterley – John Cage
Dene Olding, Melbourne Symphony Orchestra, Iwaki – Violin Concertos
Best Children's Album Mic Conway – Whoopee!Bananas in Pyjamas – Bananas in Pyjamas
Colin Buchanan – I Want My Mummy
Franciscus Henri – My Favourite Nursery Rhymes
Monica Trapaga – Monica's Tea Party
Best Original Soundtrack / Cast / Show Recording Original Cast Recording – Hot Shoe ShuffleThe Australian Opera, Giacomo Puccini – La Boheme
M. Easton, M. Atkins – Snowy Original Soundtrack
Carl Vine – Bedevil
John Waters, Lennon & McCartney – Looking Through a Glass Onion

Artisan Awards
Song of the Year James Cruickshank, Tex Perkins, Dan Rumour – "The Honeymoon Is Over" (The Cruel Sea)James Cruickshank, Tex Perkins, Dan Rumour – "Black Stick" (The Cruel Sea)
Diesel – "Never Miss Your Water" (Diesel)
Neil Finn – "Distant Sun" (Crowded House)
Tim Finn – "Persuasion" (Tim Finn)
Best Cover Art Pierre Baroni, Mushroom Art – Deborah Conway – Bitch EpicKristyna Higgins, Jan Manby – The Cruel Sea – The Honeymoon Is Over
Marcelle Lunam – Things of Stone and Wood – The Yearning
Nick Seymour – Crowded House – Together Alone
Kevin Wilkins, Midnight Oil – Midnight Oil – Earth and Sun and Moon
Best Video Richard Lowenstein – INXS – "The Gift"Andrew Dominik – The Cruel Sea – "The Honeymoon Is Over"
Paul Elliott – Midnight Oil – "Outbreak of Love"
Paul Elliott, Sally Bongers – Christine Anu & Paul Kelly – "Last Train"
Craig Griffin – John Farnham – "Seemed Like a Good Idea (At the Time)"
Engineer of the Year Simon Hussey – Daryl Braithwaite – "Barren Ground", "The World as It Is"; – Company of Strangers – "Baby, You're a Rich Man", "Daddy's Gonna Make You a Star"Mark Forrester – Peter Andre – "Funky Junky", "Let's Get it On"; – Grant McLennan – "Lighting Fires", "Surround Me"
Nick Mainsbridge, Kalju Tonuma - The Sharp - "Scratch My Back", "Yeah I Want You", "Train of Thought"
Michael Letho – Daryl Braithwaite –  "Barren Ground", "The World As it Is", "Breaking the Rules", "Look What Your Love Has Done"
Tony Cohen – The Cruel Sea – "The Honeymoon is Over"; – Tiddas – "Waiting"; – Dave Graney & the Coral Snakes – "You're Just Too Hip Baby"
Producer of the YearTony Cohen – The Cruel Sea – The Honeymoon Is OverAngelique Cooper – Christine Anu with Paul Kelly – "Last Train"; Neil Murray – "Holy Road" (Remix); Yothu Yindi – "World Turning" (Remix)
James Black – Things of Stone and Wood – "Rock This Boat", "Single Perfect Raindrop", "Heidelberg", "Barkley Street"
Joe Camilleri – The Black Sorrows – "Stir It Up", "Come on, Come On"
Johnny Diesel – Diesel – "I've Been Loving You Too Long", "Never Miss Your Water", "Masterplan"
Simon Hussey –  Company of Strangers – "Baby, You're a Rich Man", "Daddy's Gonna Make You a Star";

Special Achievement AwardStan RofeARIA Hall of Fame inductee
The Hall of Fame inductee was:Men at Work'''

References

External links
ARIA Awards official website
List of 1994 winners

1994 music awards
1994 in Australian music
ARIA Music Awards